Olcinia is a genus of bush crickets in the sub-family Pseudophyllinae and tribe Cymatomerini. They are found in tropical forest regions of Indo-China and Malesia.

Description
Olcinia bush crickets are somewhat similar to another Asian genus Sathrophyllia but have relatively wrinkled margin to their fore-wings. They typically have cryptic colouration and likewise sit close to branches of trees and bushes, spreading their legs and antennae along the branch, close to the surface to provide camouflage.

Species
The Orthoptera Species File lists the following:
Olcinia constanti Bresseel & Vermeersch, 2017
Olcinia crenifolia Haan, 1842
Olcinia dentata de Jong, 1939
Olcinia erosifolia Stål, 1877 - type species (locality Philippines)
Olcinia excisa Karny, 1923
Olcinia grandis de Jong, 1939
Olcinia mahakamensis de Jong, 1939
Olcinia nuichuana Bresseel & Vermeersch, 2017
Olcinia pallidifrons Karny, 1926

References

External links

Tettigoniidae genera
Pseudophyllinae
Orthoptera of Asia